Geoff Robinson or Geoffrey Robinson may refer to:
 Geoff Robinson (rugby, born 1934) (1934–2011), English rugby union and rugby league footballer
 Geoffrey Robinson (bishop) (1937–2020), Roman Catholic Australian Auxiliary Bishop of Sydney
 Geoffrey Robinson (born 1938), British MP
 Geoffrey Robinson (sport shooter), British sports shooter
 Geoff Robinson (broadcaster) (born 1943), British-born New Zealand broadcaster
 Geoff Robinson (cricketer) (1944–2015), English cricketer
 Geoff Robinson (rugby league, born 1957), Australian rugby league player
 InControl (1985–2019), stage name of Geoff Robinson, American esports player and commentator

See also
 Geoffrey Robertson (born 1946), Australian and British barrister
 Jeff Robinson (disambiguation)